Edwin Taylor, CMG was a Colonial Treasurer of Hong Kong from 1931 to 1937. 

He acted as Acting Colonial Treasurer on 7 May 1931 and Colonial Treasurer on 2 July 1931. He retired on 10 March 1937.

He was awarded Companion of the Order of St Michael and St George (CMG) in the 1936 Birthday Honours for his public service.

References

Government officials of Hong Kong
Financial Secretaries of Hong Kong
Members of the Executive Council of Hong Kong
Members of the Legislative Council of Hong Kong

20th-century Hong Kong people
Year of birth missing
Year of death missing